Lambda (stylized λ /lambda/) is a Greek luxury olive oil brand, produced by Speiron company, founded in 2007 by Greek entrepreneur Giorgos Kolliopoulos. It is branded as the first luxury olive oil in the world. Its brand name originates from the Greek word λάδι (ladi) which means oil in Greek.

Description
Wallpaper magazine mentions the product's stylized packaging. The product is marketed to affluent consumers through exclusive distribution channels and word of mouth. 
It is available in several countries as well as sold online. In 2011, the company signed a direct vendor agreement with Harrods.

 Acidity: Below 0.3
 Packaging: 100 ml. & 500 ml. glass bottle - handcrafted gift box packaging
 Specifications: Cold extraction, superior blend of Koroneiki olive varieties, entirely bottled by hand

In October 2010, the company announced the launch of the Bespoke Lambda, which they call the first personalized olive oil and the most expensive globally.

In December 2014, λ /lambda/ olive oil was included in the most expensive Christmas hamper that broke the Guinness World Record for a hamper.

Awards
Silver Award Medal, New York Festivals 2008.
LUX UK Global Excellence Awards, Luxury Olive Oil of 2018.
LUX UK Global Excellence Awards, Luxury Olive Oil of 2019.

References

External links
 Official website

Food product brands
Olive oil
Greek cuisine
Greek brands
Products introduced in 2007
2007 establishments in Greece